The Saltaruccio is a stream in the department of Haute-Corse, Corsica, France. It is a tributary of the Fiumorbo.

Course

It rises to the northeast of the  Punta di Taoria and flows northeast and then east between the villages of Poggio-di-Nazza and Lugo-di-Nazza.
The D44 linking these villages crosses the stream.
It continues in a generally east-southeast direction to its confluence with the Fiumorbo to the northwest of the town of Ghisonaccia.

Environment

The Saltaruccio flows through the Forêts du Fiumorbu, designated as a Zone naturelle d'intérêt écologique, faunistique et floristique (ZNIEFF).
This includes the upper and middle watershed of the Abatesco and tributaries of the Fium'Orbu river such as the Saltaruccio and Varagno streams. 
The higher parts of the area are mainly covered with beech forest (Fagus sylvatica), birch groves, fir forests and laricio pines (Pinus nigra laricio). 
Lower down there are stands of maritime pines (Pinus pinaster) and holm oaks (Quercus ilex).

Tributaries

The following streams (ruisseaux) are tributaries of the Varagno (ordered by length) and sub-tributaries:
Poletrella: 
Buoni Pargoli: 
Sambuchi: 
Ternale: 
Caniozzo: 
Pane Casciolo: 
Salto Leandro: 
Nevalpiana:

Notes

Sources

Rivers of Haute-Corse
Rivers of France